The 2017 Judo World Masters was a judo tournament held in Saint Petersburg, Russia, from 16 to 17 December 2017.

Medal summary

Medal table
 Host nation

Men's events

Women's events

References

External links
 

World Masters
IJF World Masters
World Masters
Judo competitions in Russia